Dominick Newton (August 12, 1977 – February 2, 2015), better known by his stage name The Jacka, was an American rapper from Pittsburg, California.
The Jacka began his career as part of the rap group Mob Figaz.

He was killed in a shooting in Oakland, California, on February 2, 2015. The murder is currently unsolved.

Early life
Newton was born to 14-year-old parents and became the family breadwinner as a teenager, a role that landed him in prison for a year at age 18.

Newton converted to Islam at a young age and changed his name to Shaheed Akbar.

Career
His career began with the Bay Area rap group Mob Figaz after the teenaged Newton and several friends were approached by established rap artist C-Bo in a record store and went to a recording studio that day. The guest rappers appeared on "Ride Til We Die," the opening track on C-Bo's 1998 album Til My Casket Drops.  Their debut album, C-Bo's Mob Figaz, released in 1999 was a minor hit on the Billboard Hip Hop chart entering in at #63, doing fairly well selling 160,000 units. His first solo release The Jacka of the Mob Figaz in 2001 sold over 30,000 units. Jacka sold these units himself, in the Bay Area and shipping to one-stops across the country. Though great support came from the Bay Area, sixty percent of Jacka's sales came from outside of California. In 2005, The Jacka released his second solo album The Jack Artist but failed to chart. In 2009, The Jacka came out with his third solo album Tear Gas making it #93 on the Billboard chart. The Jacka's #1 song in his 2009 album Glamorous Lifestyle was an instant classic in his hometown of Oakland and the Bay Area.

Death
On February 2, 2015, he was fatally shot by an unidentified gunman in Oakland on 94th Avenue and MacArthur Boulevard. Prior to his death, he owned his own record label named The Artist Records.

Discography

Solo albums
 2001: The Jacka of the Mob Figaz
 2005: The Jack Artist
 2006: Jack of All Trades 
 2008: The Street Album (U.S. R&B #80)
 2009: Tear Gas (U.S. #93)
 2010: Broad Daylight
 2011: Flight Risk (U.S. R&B #70)
 2014: What Happened to the World
 2020: Murder Weapon

Solo Mixtapes

 2005: The Jacka: The Mixtape 
 2007: The Jacka Is the Dopest
 2010: G-Slaps Radio Vol. 1 
 2011: We Mafia
 2011: The Indictment
 2012: The Verdict
 2012: The Sentence
 2013: The Appeal

Collaborative albums

With Mob Figaz
1999: C-Bo's Mob Figaz
With Mob Figaz alumni
2002: Camp Mob Figaz: The Street Soundtrack (with various)
2003: Mob Figaz (with various) 
2005: 3 da Hard Way (with Husalah & Marvaless)
2006: Animal Planet (with Husalah)
2006: Mob Trial (with AP.9 & Husalah) 
2006: Shower Posse (with Husalah) 
2007: Mob Trial 2 (with Fed-X & Rydah J. Klyde)
2008: Mob Trial 3 The Verdict (with AP.9 & Fed-X)  U.S. R&B #91

With Ampichino
2007: Devilz Rejectz: 36 Zips 
2010: Devilz Rejects 2: House of the Dead  (U.S. R&B #83)
2018: Devilz Rejectz 3: American Horror Story

With Berner
2008: Drought Season (U.S. R&B #55)
2009: Drought Season 2 (U.S. R&B #66)
2012: Border Wars
2015: Drought Season 3

Notable collaborations
2009: The Price of Money (with 12 Gauge Shotie)  U.S. R&B #88
2010: Neva Be The Same - 20 Bricks: Season One (with Laroo)
2010: My Middle Name Is Crime EP (with Andre Nickatina)
2012: The Tonite Show (with DJ Fresh) 
2013: Never Be The Same: Season 2 - No Mercy (with Laroo)
2014: Highway Robbery (with Freeway)

Additional collaborations
2006: Explosive Mode 3: The Mob Gets Explosive (with Messy Marv, San Quinn & Husalah)
2008: Outbreak: The Epidemic (With Kel of the Western Conference)
2008: The Gobots (with Lee Majors)
2010: The Gobots 2: D-Boy Era (with Lee Majors)
2010: Jonestown (with Messy Marv & Blanco)
2012: Obey (with Blanco)
2012: 100 Lbs and Bricks of Bo (with Liqz and Joe Blow)
2013: Misfits (with Blanco)
2013: Game Over (with Blanco)
2013: Futuristic Mob (with Dubble-OO)
2013: Bullys Wit Fullys 4 (with Guce)
2013: Straight Drop (with M Dot 80)
2013: The Gobots 2.5 (with Lee Majors)
2013: Write My Wrongs (with Freeway)
2014: Risk Game (with M Dot 80)

Compilations
2005: Str8 Out da Slums (with Lil Keke)
2005: Ghetto Gumbo Raw Uncut Vol. 1 
2008: Slappin In The Trunk Vol. 5 Starring The Jacka
2009: The Jacka Hosts And Presents B.A.R.S Awards 
2010: The Dre Area Volume 2 Starring The Jacka
2011: The Jacka Presents Mobbin Thru The West Vol. 1
2011: Best of Frisco Street Show: The Jacka
2011: Retrial: Million Dollar Remix Series Vol. 1 
2012: The A.R Street Album (with The Artist Records)

Singles

See also
List of murdered hip hop musicians
List of unsolved deaths

References

External links
 

1977 births
2015 deaths
2015 murders in the United States
African-American male rappers
African-American Muslims
Converts to Islam
Crimes in Oakland, California
Musicians from California
People from Pittsburg, California
Mob Figaz members
Rappers from the San Francisco Bay Area
West Coast hip hop musicians
Gangsta rappers
Deaths by firearm in California
Unsolved murders in the United States
20th-century African-American people
21st-century African-American people